101 Zen Stories is a 1919 compilation of Zen koans including 19th and early 20th century anecdotes compiled by Nyogen Senzaki, and a translation of Shasekishū, written in the 13th century by Japanese Zen master Mujū (無住) (literally, "non-dweller"). The book was reprinted by Paul Reps as part of Zen Flesh, Zen Bones. Well-known koans in the collection include A Cup of Tea (1), The Sound of One Hand (21), No Water, No Moon (29), and Everything is Best (31).

See also
 Blue Cliff Record
 The Gateless Gate
 Book of Equanimity

References

External links
 101 Zen Koans
 Koan Studies Pages

Zen koan collections
1919 books